Lawrence R. Rinder is a contemporary art curator and museum director. He directed the Berkeley Art Museum and Pacific Film Archive (BAMPFA) from 2008 to 2020.

Education
Rinder received a B.A. in art from Reed College and an M.A. in art history from Hunter College. He has held teaching positions at UC Berkeley, Columbia University, and Deep Springs College.

He was the Dean of Graduate Studies at California College of the Arts in San Francisco, a position he was appointed to in 2004.

Career

Exhibitions

Rinder served as the Anne and Joel Ehrenkranz Curator of Contemporary Art at the Whitney Museum of American Art where he organized exhibitions including "The American Effect", "BitStreams", the 2002 Whitney Biennial, and "Tim Hawkinson", which was given the 2005 award for best monographic exhibition in a New York museum by the United States chapter of the International Association of Art Critics. Prior to the Whitney, Rinder was founding director of the CCA Wattis Institute for Contemporary Arts, in San Francisco, and served as Assistant Director and Curator for Twentieth-Century Art at the Berkeley Art Museum and Pacific Film Archive. Among the many exhibitions he organized at these institutions are "Searchlight: Consciousness at the Millennium" (1999), "Knowledge of Higher Worlds: Rudolf Steiner's Blackboard Drawings" (1997), "Louise Bourgeois: Drawings" (1996), "In a Different Light" (1995), "Félix González-Torres" (1994), and "Where There Is Where There: The Prints of John Cage" (1989).

In September 2007, the Judah L. Magnes Museum in Berkeley, California, opened an installation guest curated by Rinder entitled Shahrokh Yadegari: Through Music. This installation served as the latest exhibition in the Museum's REVISIONS series, in which contemporary artists create original installations based on objects in the Museum's extensive collections.

Publishing
He has published poetry, fiction, and art criticism in Zyzzyva, Fresh Men 2: New Voices in Gay Fiction, Flash Art, Artforum, nest, The Village Voice, Fillip, and Parkett. He is the author of a novel, Revenge of the Decorated Pigs, and a novella (with Colter Jacobsen) "Tuleyome", which was described by Colin Herd in 3:AM Magazine as "Comic and melancholy in equal measure, Tuleyome is the most fully realised example of a text-photo-novel I can think of, where the text and the photos are equal players in the advance of a complex and fascinating narrative, and where the formal properties of both text and photograph are interrogated and laid bare."

Art Life: Selected Writings, 1991-2005, published by Gregory R. Miller and Company in Spring 2006, is his first book of essays. His first play, “The Wishing Well," co-authored with Kevin Killian, premiered in 2006 and was published that year in The Back Room Anthology (Clear Cut Press). In 2003, Rinder was inducted into the National Register of Peer Professionals of the U.S. General Services Administration, and in 2005, he was appointed to the San Francisco Arts Commission by Mayor Gavin Newsom.

BAMPFA 
Rinder led a major move for the museum from an older – seismically unstable – brutalist building, to a new building designed by Diller Scofidio + Renfro in downtown Berkeley.  He announced his retirement from BAMPFA in September 2019.

References

External links
In 2005, Gregory R. Miller & Co. published Art Life: Selected Writings, 1991-2005 by Lawrence Rinder.

Year of birth missing (living people)
Living people
American art curators
Directors of museums in the United States
Hunter College alumni
University of California, Berkeley staff
Deep Springs College faculty
Reed College alumni
People associated with the Whitney Museum of American Art